Delia Norma Pinchetti de Sierra Morales is an Argentine politician and a former member of Fuerza Republicana (FR).

Biography
Delia Norma Pinchetti de Sierra Morales is a former Senator for Tucumán Province. She was elected in 2003 on behalf of the Republican Force, but left that party in May 2009.
Pinchetti's husband, Ramón Sierra Morales, was also active in the FR and served as a provincial legislator. Ahead of the June 2009 legislative elections, Pinchetti was dropped by FR as a candidate. Subsequently she announced her departure from the party and was confirmed as the lead candidate for National Deputy for the Unión PRO Federal alliance formed by Mauricio Macri's PRO and dissident Peronists.

References

External links
Senate profile

Living people
Members of the Argentine Senate for Tucumán
Women members of the Argentine Senate
People from Tucumán Province
21st-century Argentine women politicians
21st-century Argentine politicians
Fuerza Republicana politicians
Year of birth missing (living people)